Queen Hoesun of the Jinju So clan was presumed as the queen consort of Goryeo dynasty though her marriage with King Heonjong of Goryeo. Meanwhile, it was disputed whether she really became the Queen or just added in Jinju So clan's records since all of her existence and appearance didn't appear in Goryeosa records.

References

Royal consorts of the Goryeo Dynasty
11th-century Korean people
Jinju So clan
Year of birth unknown
Year of death unknown